Pepperwort is a common name for two different plants:

Plants in the species Lepidium
Marsilea minuta